Zsolt Érsek (born 13 June 1966) is a Hungarian fencer. He won a bronze medal in the team foil event at the 1988 Summer Olympics.

References

External links
 

1966 births
Living people
Hungarian male foil fencers
Olympic fencers of Hungary
Fencers at the 1988 Summer Olympics
Fencers at the 1992 Summer Olympics
Fencers at the 1996 Summer Olympics
Olympic bronze medalists for Hungary
Olympic medalists in fencing
Fencers from Budapest
Medalists at the 1988 Summer Olympics
Universiade medalists in fencing
Universiade gold medalists for Hungary
Medalists at the 1987 Summer Universiade
Medalists at the 1989 Summer Universiade
20th-century Hungarian people
21st-century Hungarian people